Mitogen-activated protein kinase 13 (MAPK 13), also known as stress-activated protein kinase 4 (SAPK4), is an enzyme that in humans is encoded by the MAPK13 gene.

Function 

The protein encoded by this gene is a member of the MAP kinase family. MAP kinases act as an integration point for multiple biochemical signals, and are involved in a wide variety of cellular processes such as proliferation, differentiation, transcription regulation and development. This kinase is closely related to p38 MAP kinase, both of which can be activated by proinflammatory cytokines and cellular stress. MAP kinase kinases 3, and 6 can phosphorylate and activate this kinase. Transcription factor ATF2, and microtubule dynamics regulator stathmin have been shown to be the substrates of this kinase.

References

Further reading

EC 2.7.11
Protein kinases